Ekka Dokka is a drama show that premiered on Bengali general entertainment channel Star Jalsha from 18 July 2022. The show is being produced under the banner of Magic Moments Motion Pictures. The show has Saptarshi Maulik, Sonamoni Saha, Pratik Sen, Aparajita Ghosh Das, Sudip Mukherjee and many other popular actors.

Plot 

Pokhraj Sengupta (Saptarshi Maulik) is the youngest member of the affluent Sengupta family, who completed his MBBS from the college and hospital owned by his family. His father, uncle and grandfather are medical practitioners and run the hospital. Radhika Majumdar (Sonamoni Saha) is Pokhraj's childhood friend and classmate. They were childhood friends who grew to become extremely competitive in studies, influenced by their respective families. The two families have an acrimonious relationship fueled primarily by the women in Pokhraj's family. The family enemity spills over to the equation between Pokhraj and Radhika who do not miss a chance to misunderstand each other. Pokhraj and Radhika actually love each other from childhood but the inharmonious relationship between their respective families makes them wary to admit it. 

A conspiracy sets off a chain reaction of events and incidents. Circumstances influence Radhika to intentionally marry Pokhraj that ultimately leads to a divorce. Constant accusations made by a hurt and angry Pokhraj influence Radhika's decision to pursue her internship at an alternate hospital under the guidance of Dr Anirban Guha (Pratik Sen). Dr Guha is a very good doctor respected by everyone at the hospital but also feared by all due to his caustic personality.

How do Radhika Majumdar and Pokhraj Sengupta navigate the inharmonious relationship between their families, react or face the challenges or resolve their differences? What dimension does the relationship between Dr Anirban Guha and Radhika take? What are the changing dynamics between Pokhraj, Radhika and Anirban and their respective families forms the rest of the story.

Cast

Main 
 Saptarshi Maulik as Pokhraj Sengupta- Radhika's former husband, a final year MBBS student, Ronodip and Sharmistha's only son (Main Male Lead) (2022–present)
 Sonamoni Saha as Radhika Majumder (formerly Sengupta) - Pokhraj’s former wife, a final year MBBS student , Kushal and Sudakshina's youngest daughter, (Main Female Lead) (2022–present)
 Aparajita Ghosh Das as Ankita Majumdar- a Law Student, Kushal and Sudakshina's eldest daughter, Radhika's Elder Sister (Parallel Female Lead) (2022–present)
 Pratik Sen as Dr. Anirban Guha (2023 – present) (Parallel Male Lead)
 Swapnila Chakraborty as Ranjaboti (2023)

Pokhraj's Family 

 Ashok Bhattacharya as Dr. Kalikrishna Sengupta– Pokhraj's grandfather , head of the Sengupta family (2022 – present)
 Anashua Majumdar as Binodini Sengupta – Pokhraj's grandmother (2022 – present) (Antagonist)
 Moyna Mukherji as Sharmistha Sengupta -  Pokhraj's mother (2022 – present) (Antagonist)
 Bhaskar Banerjee as Dr. Ronodip Sengupta – Pokhraj's father, Sharmistha's husband, Pupe's former love interest. (2022 – present)
 Sudip Mukherjee as Dr. Subhadip Sengupta –Pokhraj's uncle (2022 – present)(Antagonist)
 Anindita Raychaudhury as Tamali Sengupta – Pokhraj's paternal aunt (2022 – present)(Antagonist)
 Antara Pakira Nandy as Indira Sengupta -  Pokhraj's paternal aunt (2022 – present)
 Diganta Bagchi as  Biswadip Sengupta – Pokhraj's paternal uncle (2022 – present)(Antagonist)
 Aishi Bhattacharya as Arushi Sengupta - Pokhraj's cousin (2022 – present)(Antagonist)
 Priyanka Mitra as Srija Sengupta – Pokhraj's cousin (2022 – present)(Antagonist)
 Sujoy Saha as  Kohinur Sengupta- Bublu’s husband, Pokhraj's cousin, an engineering student (2022 – present)
 Krittika Chakraborty as Ashmi Sengupta - Pokhraj's youngest cousin (2022 – present)
 Tanusree Goswami as Nandita Roy (née Sengupta) – Pokhraj's aunt and Shreyan's mother (2022 – present)(Antagonist)
 Aritram Mukherjee as Shreyan Roy – Ankita's former love-interest, Pokhraj's cousin brother (2022 – present)(Antagonist)

Radhika's Family 

 Chandan Sen as Dr. Kushal Majumdar – A renowned doctor; Radhika and Ankita's father (2022 – present)
 Malabika Sen as Sudakshina Majumdar – A dancer; Radhika and Ankita's mother; Kushal's wife (2022 – present)
 Dulal Lahiri as Jadabendra Majumdar – Radhika and Ankita's grandfather (2022 – present)
 Anamika Saha as Charulata Majumdar – Radhika and Ankita's grandmother (2022 – present)
 Manujshree Ganguly as Mrinalini Majumdar aka Pupe – Radhika and Ankita's paternal aunt; Kushal's younger sister, Ronodip's former love interest. (2022 – present)
 Ipshita Mukherjee as Mrittika Sengupta (née Majumder) aka Bublu - Kuntal's daughter, Kushal's niece, Radhika and Ankita's cousin, Kohinur's wife
 Unknown as Kuntal Majumder- Kushal and Pupe's brother, Bublu's father who lives in village
 Rajanya Mitra as  Baishakhi Majumder - Kuntal's wife

Others 

 Sayanta Modak as Pallav Mukherjee aka Paul-radhika and Pokhraj's class mate, radhika's friend who is secretly in love with her
 Avijit Das as Pokhraj's friend (2022)
 Rahul Chakraborty (2022 – present)
 Suzi Bhowmik as Priya Das
 Badshah Moitra as Soumyadip Bose, a lawyer and Ankita's teacher and love interest  (2022 – present) 
 Bulbul Biswas as Drishti- Radhika's friend
 Subhadra Chakraborty as Anirban's aunt

References

External links 
Ekka Dokka on Disney+ Hotstar

Bengali-language television programming in India
2022 Indian television series debuts
Star Jalsha original programming